An open-wheel single-seater (often known as formula car) is a car with the wheels outside the car's main body, and usually having only one seat. Open-wheel cars contrast with street cars, sports cars, stock cars, and touring cars, which have their wheels below the body or inside fenders. Open-wheel cars are built both for road racing and oval track racing. Street-legal open-wheel cars, such as the Ariel Atom, are scarce as they are often impractical for everyday use.

History
American racecar driver and constructor Ray Harroun was an early pioneer of the concept of a lightweight single-seater, open-wheel "monoposto" racecar. After working as a mechanic in the automotive industry, Harroun began competitive professional racing in 1906, winning the AAA National Championship in 1910. He was then hired by the Marmon Motor Car Company as chief engineer, charged with building a racecar intended to race at the first Indianapolis 500, which he went on to win. He developed a revolutionary concept which would become the originator and forefather of the single-seater (i.e. monoposto) racecar design. Harroun has also been credited by some as pioneering the rear-view mirror which appeared on his 1911 Indianapolis 500 winning car, though he himself claimed he got the idea from seeing a mirror used for a similar purpose on a horse-drawn vehicle in 1904.

 
Prior to World War II, street automobiles generally had wheels that protruded beyond the vehicle's main body, though they were typically covered with mudguards to protect the car body (and following traffic) from water and mud spray. With the advent of unibody vehicle construction, the desire to maximise interior space, to improve aerodynamics , and aircraft-inspired styling trends of the era, by the end of the 1950s the majority of new road-registerable vehicles had wheels that were under the main body of the car, and thus the open-wheel design became almost exclusively associated with racing vehicles. 

Formula One cars have almost exclusively used the open-wheel design throughout the history of the championship. The only notable exception was the "Monza body" variation of the Mercedes-Benz W196 racer of 1954-55, which covered the wheels with bodywork for aerodynamic reasons.  Modern Formula One regulations mandate the open-wheel configuration.

Design
A typical open-wheeler has a minimal cockpit, sufficient only to enclose the driver's body, with the head exposed to the air. In the Whelen Modified Tour and other short track modified series, the driver's head is contained in the car. In modern cars, the engine is often located directly behind the driver and drives the rear wheels; except in asphalt modified cars, such as the Whelen Modified Tour, where the engine is in front of the driver. Depending on the rules of the class, many types of open-wheelers have wings at the front and rear of the vehicle, as well as a very low and virtually flat undertray that helps achieve additional aerodynamic downforce pushing the car onto the road.  While many other categories of racing cars produce downforce, the top categories of open-wheel racing cars (particularly Formula One and Indycar) produce far more downforce relative to their mass than any other racing category, allowing much higher corner speeds on comparable tracks.

Some major races, such as the Singapore Grand Prix, Monaco Grand Prix (sanctioned by Formula One) and the Long Beach Grand Prix (sanctioned by IndyCar), are held on temporary street circuits. However, most open-wheel races are on dedicated road courses, such as Watkins Glen in the US, Nürburgring in Germany, Spa-Francorchamps in Belgium and Silverstone in Great Britain. In the United States, some top-level open-wheel events are held on ovals, of both short track and superspeedway variety, with an emphasis being placed more on speed and endurance than the maneuverability inherently required by road and street course events. The Whelen Modified Tour is the only opened wheeled race car series endorsed by NASCAR. This series races on most of NASCAR's most famous tracks in the United States. Other asphalt modified series race on short tracks in the United States and Canada, such as Wyoming County International Speedway in New York. The best-attended oval race in the world is the annual Indianapolis 500 (Indy 500) in Speedway, Indiana, sanctioned by IndyCar; in the United States, it is quite common to refer to open-wheel cars as IndyCars, or Champ Cars, because of their recognizable appearance and widespread popularity across America at the Indy 500.

Compared to covered-wheel race cars, open-wheeled cars allow more precise placement of the front wheels on the race course, as the tires are clearly visible to the driver. This allows the maximum potential of the cars to be wrung out during cornering and passing maneuvers. Furthermore, open-wheeled cars are less tolerant of vehicle-to-vehicle contact, which usually results in vehicle damage and retiring, whereas some level of contact is expected in covered-wheel racing, as for example in NASCAR. Open-wheeled drivers must be extremely precise to avoid contact.

Minimum weight requirements tend to be much lower than in categories that more closely resemble street-legal vehicles, such as sports cars, touring cars, and stock cars.

Driving
Open-wheeled racing is among the fastest in the world. It is difficult to give precise figures for the absolute top speeds of Formula One cars, as the cars do not have speedometers as such and the data are not generally released by teams. The 'speed traps' on fast circuits such as Monza give a good indication, but are not necessarily located at the point on the track where the car is travelling at its fastest.

Regardless of top speeds, Formula One open-wheel race cars hold the outright lap record at the circuits which they race due to their combination of top speed, acceleration, and cornering abilities.  For example, at the Monza Circuit the fastest lap in the 2021 Grand Prix (Daniel Ricciardo 1:24.812) is more than six seconds per lap faster than the fastest closed-wheel racing car, an LMP1 sports car, and more than 20 seconds per lap faster than the DTM touring car lap record.

Driving an open-wheel car is substantially different from driving a car with fenders. Virtually all Formula One and Indycar drivers spend some time in various open-wheel categories before joining either top series. Open-wheel vehicles, due to their light weight, aerodynamic capabilities, and powerful engines, are often considered the fastest racing vehicles available and among the most challenging to master. Wheel-to-wheel contact is dangerous, particularly when the forward edge of one tire contacts the rear of another tire: since the treads are moving in opposite directions (one upward, one downward) at the point of contact, both wheels rapidly decelerate, torquing the chassis of both cars and often causing one or both vehicles to be suddenly and powerfully flung upwards (the rear car tends to pitch forward, and the front car tends to pitch backward.) An example of this is the 2005 Chicagoland crash of Ryan Briscoe with Alex Barron.

Advantages
The lower weight of an open-wheel racecar allows for better performance. While the exposure of the wheels to the airstream causes a very high aerodynamic drag at high speeds, it allows improved cooling of the brakes, which is important on road courses with their frequent changes of pace.

Gallery

Safety
In 2018, several single seater series such as Formula One, Formula 2 (with their new Dallara F2 2018 chassis), and Formula E (with their new Spark SRT05e chassis) introduced a protection system to the cockpit called the "halo", a wishbone-shaped frame aimed to deflect debris away from a driver's head. Despite initial criticism, including for the reason of obstructing the driver's vision, it showed some praise in the Formula 2 sprint race in Catalunya when Nirei Fukuzumi spun and had the back of his car land on fellow countryman Tadasuke Makino's halo. In the Formula 1 Belgian Grand Prix, McLaren driver Fernando Alonso was sent airborne after being hit from behind by the Renault of Nico Hülkenberg and struck the halo of Sauber driver Charles Leclerc, thereby saving the Monegasque driver from a visor strike.

In 2019, the newly-formed FIA Formula 3 Championship introduced a halo to their new chassis which was unveiled at the 2018 Abu Dhabi Grand Prix.

In 2020, the Indycar Series adopted a halo combined with an aeroscreen, built by Red Bull Advanced Technologies. 

At the start of the 2020 Bahrain Grand Prix, Romain Grosjean collided with Daniil Kvyat in which his car broke in two and burst into flames as it split the barrier. The halo helped prevent Grosjean from possible decapitation while it allowed him to escape from the fire.

References
 https://www.formula1.com/